The Indian Super League (ISL) is a men's professional football league, which is one of two co-existing top tier leagues in Indian football system along with the I-League.

The league currently comprises 11 clubs. Each season of the tournament generally runs from November to March. During the league stage of the competition, each club plays against all the other clubs in a round-robin style. At the end of the league stage, the team with the most points gets declared the Premiers and presented with a trophy named League Winners Shield, and the top four clubs qualify for the play-offs. The season then culminates with the ISL Final to determine the Champions who are presented with the ISL Trophy.

List of seasons

ISL Finals

Notes

References

External links
 WorldFootball.net

Indian Super League lists